Vanishing Hoofs is a 1926 American silent Western film directed by John P. McCarthy and written by Betty Burbridge and L. V. Jefferson.

Cast 
 Hal Taliaferro as Wally Marsh
 Alma Rayford as Lucy Bowers
 William Ryno as Colonel Bowers
 Hazel Keener as Edith Marsh
 Frank Ellis as Jack Warren
 William Dunn as Jack Slade
 Jane Sherman as kate
 Slim Whitaker as the doctor
 W. J. Willett as the sheriff

References

External links 
 
 

1926 films
1926 Western (genre) films
Films directed by John P. McCarthy
American black-and-white films
Silent American Western (genre) films
1920s English-language films
1920s American films